Palopo or Kota Palopo is a city located in South Sulawesi, Indonesia, and the second-largest city in the province. Until it acquired its autonomy, Palopo was the capital of Luwu Regency. The area of the city is 247.52 km2, and it had a population of 148,033 at the 2010 Census and 184,681 at the 2020 Census, comprising 92,444 males and 92,237 females. The official estimate as at mid 2021 was 187,331.

History 

Palopo was founded c. 1620, probably under the second Muslim ruler of Luwu Kingdom, Sultan Abdullah Muhiddin, who is buried at Malangke, the former palace centre of Luwu. His momental grave, which was carved with Majapahit-style floral decorations, was destroyed by Kahar Muzakkar rebels in the 1950s: nothing today remains except the location. The advantage of Palopo over the former palace centre was the potential for trade with the Toraja-speaking Seko-Rongkong valleys. The town sits at the foot of a steep, winding pass which leads into the highland regions. In the late 19th century this trade consisted primarily of coffee and slaves. Gold panned from upland rivers may also have been an attraction. Dammar was an important export in the later period.

Little is known of Palopo before the Dutch annexation of South Sulawesi in 1905. The only Western visitor to have left an account of the town was James Brooke (later Rajah of Sarawak), who described it in the 1830s as 'a miserable town, consisting of about 300 houses, scattered and dilapidated'. It is the location of the Palopo Old Mosque, South Sulawesi's oldest mosque. Built from blocks of white coral, with a three-tiered roof representing the ancient Austronesian cosmos, the Mesjid Jami' is said to have been built during the reign of Sultan Abdullah. It has a 19th-century dedicatory inscription behind one of its doors, presumably reflecting a restoration. The royal graveyard lies to the north at Lokkoe and contains pyramidical stone mausolea in which lie the remains of Luwu's 17th to 20th-century rulers.

Administrative districts 
Palopo City is divided into nine Districts (Kecamatan), tabulated below with their areas and their populations at the 2010 Census and the 2020 Census, together wiuth the official estimates as at mid 2021. The table also includes the locations of the district administrative centres and the number of urban villages (kelurahan) in each district.

Climate
Palopo has a tropical rainforest climate (Af) with heavy rainfall year-round.

References 

Populated places in South Sulawesi
Cities in Indonesia